The Union County School District is a public school district based in Union County, Mississippi (USA).

The district serves the towns of Blue Springs and Myrtle, the Union County part of Sherman, and most of rural Union County, as well as small portions of New Albany.

Its headquarters are in New Albany.

Schools
East Union Attendance Center
Ingomar Attendance Center
Myrtle Attendance Center
West Union Attendance Center

Demographics

2006-07 school year
There were a total of 2,642 students enrolled in the Union County School District during the 2006–2007 school year. The gender makeup of the district was 50% female and 50% male. The racial makeup of the district was 8.44% African American, 90.31% White, 1.21% Hispanic, and 0.04% Asian. 40.3% of the district's students were eligible to receive free lunch.

Previous school years

Accountability statistics

See also

List of school districts in Mississippi

References

External links

Education in Union County, Mississippi
School districts in Mississippi